Joe Williams Live! A Swingin' Night at Birdland is a 1962 live album by the American jazz singer Joe Williams recorded at the Birdland jazz club in New York City.

Scott Yanow, reviewing the album for Allmusic, praises the "strong quintet" accompanying Williams and his "well-rounded and thoroughly enjoyable set".

The initial Billboard review from October 27, 1962, listed the album as having 'Strong Sales Potential' and described it as a "swinging album that shows off [Williams] vibrant vocal style" and that he "comes through with exciting performances of blues and ballads".

Track listing
"September in the Rain" (Al Dubin, Harry Warren) – 2:50
"Come Back Baby" (Walter Davis) – 5:57
"5 o'clock in the Morning" (Joe Williams) – 2:49
"By the River St. Marie" (Edgar Leslie, Harry Warren) – 3:24
"This Can't Be Love" (Richard Rodgers, Lorenz Hart) – 1:50
"Teach Me Tonight" (Sammy Cahn, Gene DePaul) – 4:03
"Alright, Okay, You Win" (Sidney Wyche) – 2:41
"I Was Telling Her About You" (Bill Charlap, Don George) – 3:51
"Have You Met Miss Jones?" (Rodgers, Hart) – 1:40
"Roll 'Em Pete" (Pete Johnson, Big Joe Turner) – 4:12
"You're Everything But Mine" – 1:47
"Falling in Love with Love" (Rodgers, Hart) – 2:57
"Goin' to Chicago Blues" (Count Basie, Jimmy Rushing) – 4:54 	
"The Very Thought of You" (Ray Noble) – 5:31

Personnel 
Joe Williams – vocals
Jimmy Forrest – tenor saxophone
Harry "Sweets" Edison – trumpet
Hugh Lawson – piano
Ike Isaacs – double bass
Clarence Johnson – drums
Production
Tristan Powell – engineer, remixing
Chris Sheridan – liner notes
Teddy Reig – production
Michael Cuscuna – reissue producer

References

1962 live albums
Albums recorded at Birdland
Joe Williams (jazz singer) live albums
Roulette Records live albums